Hervé I (died after 25 June 955), Count of Perche and Mortagne.

Hervé appears several times between 941 and 946 in the entourage of Hugh the Great and is likely Hervei Comiti Mauritianae cited in a transaction dated June 24, 955.

According to Hervé I of Mortagne, sourced by the work of Settipani, Hervé was either the son or son-in-law of Hugh I, Count of Maine.

Hervé married Melisende (possibly a daughter of Hugh I).  They had a number of children:
 Hervé II, Count of Mortagne-du-Perche
 Gerberge du Perche, married Gelduin, Seigneur de Saumur
 Hildegarde of Perche, married Hugh I, Viscount of Châteaudun.

Hervé I was succeeded either by his son Hervé II or Fulcois, the husband of his granddaughter Melissende.

Sources 
Settipani, Christian, Les vicomtes de Châteaudun et leurs alliés, dans Onomastique et Parenté dans l'Occident médiéval, Oxford, Linacre, Unit for Prosopographical Research, 2000

Europäische Stammtafeln, Vol. III, Les Vicomtes de Châteaudun

Medieval Lands Project, Perche, Mortagne

955 deaths

Year of birth unknown
Counts of Perche